Charidotella sexpunctata, the golden tortoise beetle, is a species of beetle in the leaf beetle family, Chrysomelidae. It is native to the Americas.

Taxonomy
There are two subspecies, ssp. bicolor and ssp. sexpunctata.

Description
Adult C. sexpunctata measure 5–7 mm in length. They are variable in color from reddish-brown with black spots to brilliant, mirror-like gold, earning it the nickname "goldbug". Elytral margins are expanded and nearly transparent.

The color changes through its development, during mating, and during times of disturbance, such as when it is touched by a human researcher. Scientists have not examined the color-change mechanism in this species.  However, color change in the related Panamanian Charidotella egregia (also called 'golden tortoise beetle') occurs when this beetle's elytra hydrate and dehydrate.  Adults of both species can turn from shiny gold through reddish-brown when disturbed.

Lifecycle
Female Charidotella sexpunctata lay clusters of  eggs on stems and on the undersides of host leaves. A spiny, yellowish or reddish brown larva emerges from its egg in 5 through 10 days. A larva accumulates its shed skins and frass on a structure called an anal fork, which it positions over its body as a fecal shield, evidently hiding the larva from predators. This is usually effective against smaller insect predators such as ants, but not larger ones, such as hemipterans. After two to three weeks, a larval Charidotella sexpunctata becomes a spiny brown frass-covered pupa, and in one to two weeks later it emerges as an adult.

Behaviour and diet
This beetle consumes foliage of plants in the family Convolvulaceae, including bindweeds, morning glory and sweet potato. Both adults and larvae feed on foliage.
These beetles play dead when disturbed.

Parasitoids
Parasitoids of this species include the eulophid wasp Tetrastichus cassidus and the tachinid fly Eucelatoriopsis dimmocki. Other predators, especially of the larvae, include ladybird beetles, damsel bugs, shield bugs and assassin bugs.

References

Beetles described in 1781
Cassidinae